The 2021 season was the 14th season for the Indian Premier League franchise Punjab Kings. They were one of the eight teams competed in the 2021 Indian Premier League. After winning only 6 matches out of 14 matches, they finished sixth in the tournament.

Background

Player retention and transfers 

The Punjab Kings retained 16 players and released nine players.

Retained Players: KL Rahul, Arshdeep Singh, Chris Gayle, Darshan Nalkande, Harpreet Brar, Mandeep Singh, Mayank Agarwal, Mohammad Shami, Murugan Ashwin, Nicholas Pooran, Sarfaraz Khan, Deepak Hooda, Ishan Porel, Ravi Bishnoi, Chris Jordan, Prabhsimran Singh, Rahul Chahar

Released Players: Glenn Maxwell, Sheldon Cottrell, Mujeeb Zadran, Hardus Viljoen, James Neesham, Krishnappa Gowtham, Karun Nair, Jagadeesha Suchith, Tajinder Singh Dhillon

Added Players: Dawid Malan, Riley Meredith, Jhye Richardson, Shahrukh Khan, Jalaj Saxena, Moises Henriques, Utkarsh Singh, Fabian Allen, Saurabh Kumar

Squad 
 Players with international caps are listed in bold.

Administration and support staff

Kit manufacturers and sponsors

|

Teams and standings

Results by match

League stage

The full schedule was published on the IPL website on 7 March 2021.

Matches

Statistics

Most runs 

 Source: ESPN Cricinfo

Most wickets

 Source: ESPN Cricinfo

Player of the match awards

References

Punjab Kings seasons
2021 Indian Premier League